Abraham Gershon of Kitov, also known as Rabbi Gershon of Brody, was probably born in or near Kuty (Kitov), Poland around 1701 and died in Jerusalem in 1761. He is best known as the Baal Shem Tov's brother-in-law.

Rabbinical career 
A scion of a famous rabbinic family, Abraham Gershon is a descendant (possibly the grandson) of Shabsai Cohen ("the ShACh") (1625–1663). Both Abraham Gershon and his father Ephraim of Brody served in one of the four beit din (Jewish Court) of Brody. It was here that he and his father encountered Rabbi Israel "Baal Shem Tov". According to the early Chasidic work Shivchei haBesht, his father gave his blessing of marriage for his sister Chana to the Baal Shem Tov on his deathbed. But once Ephraim died, Abraham Gershon was unaware of this secret betrothal until the Baal Shem Tov revealed the engagement contract.

Abraham Gershon rose to a powerful position within the Jewish community of Brody. For a time he served as a synagogue cantor. Shivchei haBesht portrays Abraham Gershon as a foil to the Baal Shem Tov. He is usually represented as a learned and lofty man of the upper class who regards his brother-in-law as lowly and untrustworthy. Abraham Gershon is probably responsible for kicking the Baal Shem Tov out of the Brody area where he ultimately settled in Medzhybizh. Later, when the Baal Shem Tov's piousness and scholarship were revealed, Abraham Gershon was won over and became one of the Baal Shem Tov's ardent admirers.

In 1745, Abraham Gershon was involved in ruling on a promiscuity case about the daughter-in-law of one of the wealthiest men in town. This man had strong connections to government officials. After ruling against the daughter-in-law, Abraham Gershon was forced to flee Brody to avoid being publicly punished. He took refuge with the Baal Shem Tov in Medzhybizh. Affiliated with new Hasidic thoughts as well as traditional Lurian liturgy, the Baal Shem Tov entrusted his brother-in-law with the education of his only son, Tzvi.

In 1747, Abraham Gershon traveled to Jerusalem, one of the first Hasidim to establish a presence in the Holy Land. There he embraced the Rashash, together with those who were students of Kabbalah. He lived in Hebron for six years. In 1753, he moved to Jerusalem and was further associated with the (kabbalistic) Yeshivat Beit El. He died in 1761 and was buried on the Mount of Olives. After the Six-Day War in 1967, his grave was rediscovered along with the grave of his second wife Bluma.

See also
 History of the Jews in Brody
 Baal Shem Tov family tree
 Yishuv haYashan

References

 Chapin, David A. and Weinstock, Ben, The Road from Letichev: The history and culture of a forgotten Jewish community in Eastern Europe, Volume 1.  iUniverse, Lincoln, NE, 2000.
 Rabinowicz, Tzvi M. The Encyclopedia of Hasidism:  Jason Aronson, Inc., 1996.
 Dresner, Samuel H., ed, Abraham Joshua Heschel, 1985, The Circle of the Baal Shem Tov: Studies in Hasidism:  The University of Chicago Press.

1700s births
1761 deaths

Year of birth uncertain
Hasidic rebbes
Hasidic rabbis in Europe
Ukrainian Hasidic rabbis
Polish Hasidic rabbis
People from Medzhybizh
Hasidic rabbis in Ottoman Palestine
Burials at the Jewish cemetery on the Mount of Olives
Polish emigrants to the Ottoman Empire